The 2021 Campeonato Paraense Finals was the final that decided the 2021 Campeonato Paraense, the 109th season of the Campeonato Paraense. The final were contested between Tuna Luso and Paysandu.

Paysandu defeated Tuna Luso 6–5 on aggregate to win their 49th Campeonato Paraense title.

Road to the final
Note: In all scores below, the score of the home team is given first.

Format
The finals were played on a home-and-away two-legged basis. If tied on aggregate, the penalty shoot-out was used to determine the winner.

Matches

First leg

Second leg

See also
2022 Copa Verde
2022 Copa do Brasil

References

Campeonato Paraense Finals